List of free games include:
List of open source video games
List of freeware video games
List of commercial games released as freeware
List of commercial video games with available source code
List of free PC games
List of free-to-play PlayStation 4 games